The 2018 Camden election took place on 3 May 2018 to elect members of Camden Council in London. The Labour Party increased their majority on the council by gaining three seats from the Conservatives, who also lost two seats to the Liberal Democrats.

Summary of results

Ward results

Belsize

Bloomsbury

Camden Town with Primrose Hill

Cantelowes

Fortune Green

Frognal and Fitzjohns

Gospel Oak

Hampstead Town

Haverstock

Highgate

Holborn and Covent Garden

Kentish Town

Kilburn

King's Cross

Regent's Park

St Pancras and Somers Town

Swiss Cottage

West Hampstead

Footnotes

References

2018 London Borough council elections
2018